Issiaka Cissé (born 20 September 1991) is an Ivorian cyclist.

Major results

2012
 4th Overall Tour du Faso
1st  Young rider classification
 8th Overall Tour du Cameroun
1st  Mountains classification
1st Stage 2
 9th Road race, African Road Championships
2013
 1st  Overall Tour du Faso
1st Stage 3
 7th Overall La Tropicale Amissa Bongo
 10th Overall Grand Prix Chantal Biya
1st  Points classification
1st  Mountains classification
1st Stages 3 & 4
2014
 3rd Road race, National Road Championships
 7th Overall Grand Prix Chantal Biya
2015
 5th Overall Tour du Cameroun
2016
 3rd Overall Tour de Côte d'Ivoire
1st Stage 5 (ITT)
 4th Overall Grand Prix Chantal Biya
1st  Points classification
1st Stage 1
 6th Overall Tour du Cameroun
2017
 1st Stage 1 Tour du Cameroun
 9th Overall La Tropicale Amissa Bongo
2018
 1st  Overall Tour de Côte d'Ivoire
1st Stages 3, 4 (ITT) & 5
 3rd Overall Grand Prix Chantal Biya
1st Stage 3
 5th Overall Tour du Cameroun
1st Stage 6
2019
 2nd Overall Tour du Cameroun
1st Stage 3
2020
 5th Overall Grand Prix Chantal Biya
2021 
 1st Stage 4 Tour du Faso

References

External links

1991 births
Living people
Ivorian male cyclists